Chech or Chechko is a geographical and historical region of the Balkan peninsula in southeastern Europe in modern-day Bulgaria and Greece. It consists of about 60 settlements and was traditionally mostly Pomak with an Orthodox Greek and Bulgarian minorities.

The Chech region is situated on the border of the much larger regions of Macedonia and Thrace. It covers the western Rhodope Mountains and the northern slopes of Falakro (Bozdag). It is divided in two: Drama Chech and Nevrokopi Chech. The first one and partially the second one is in Greece.

According to Vasil Kanchov the eastern border of Chech is the Dospat River and the western one is the river of Dabnitsa. Thus the Chech comprises the municipalities: Satovcha, Dospat and the villages in the valleys of the Dospat River and Bistritsa river. The villages in the Greek Chech are part of Kato Nevrokopi municipality and Sidironero community. The Pomak population of the Greek part of Chech was exchanged with Turkey during the Greek-Turkish population exchange in 1923 and replaced with Orthodox Christians from Turkey. Many of the Chech villages in Greece are now abandoned.

Settlements of Nevrokopski Chech 

The major settlements of the northern part of Chech are enlisted by Vasil Kanchov in two of his works.

Settlements in Bulgaria 

 Satovcha Municipality: Bogolin, Dolen, Fargovo, Godeshevo, Kochan, Kribul, Osina, Pletena, Satovcha, Slashten, Tuhovishta, Vaklinovo, Valkosel, Zhizhevo
 Dospat Municipality: Brashten, Ljubcha and Tsrancha
 Garmen Municipality: Dolno Dryanovo, Hvostiane, Krushevo, Oreshe
 Hadzhidimovo Municipality: Ablanitsa, Beslen, Blatska, Teplen

Settlements in Greece 

 Drama municipality: Kastanohoma (Zarnovitsa), Mirsinero (Pepelash)
 Nevrokopi municipality: Agios Petros (Peruh), Agriokerasea (Izbishta), Ahladomilea (Debren), Delta (Vitovo), Diplohori (Dablen), Eklisaki (Manastir), Erimoklisia (Kolyarba), Katahloron (Rakishten), Kremasta (Lozna), Kritaristra (Kashitsa), Lakouda (Gorna Lakavitsa), Mavrohori (Tisovo), Melisomandra (Maloshijtsa), Mesovuni (Siderovo), Milopetra (Mazhdel), Mikroklisura (Dolna Lakavitsa), Mikromilia (Ustitsa), Perasma (Stranen), Pochan, Poliliton (Sarchan, Staredzik), Potami (Borovo), Psihron (Kosten), Shurdilovo, Virsan (Vrashten), Vrahohori (Boren)
 Sidironero community:  Dobryadzil, Evrenes (Pulovo), Kainchen (Antilalos), Kalikarpo (Lovchishta), Kesariano (Ruskovo), Klista (Kolyush), Kokino (Barhovo), Limon (Rashovo), Magnisio (Grazhdel), Oropedio (Vladikovo), Papades (Popovo selo), Plakostroto (Glum), Sidironero, (Osenitsa), Skaloti (Liban), Stavrodromi (Orhovo), Voskotopi (Verdzhenitsa, Drazhenitsa), Vounohori (Pribojna), Vrahotopos (Kalchovo)

Italics indicates not inhabited settlement at the 2001 census.

See also 

 Veda Slovena

Notes 

 
Drama (regional unit)
Historical regions in Bulgaria
Historical regions in Greece